Quimarán (Guimarán in Spanish) is one of 12 parishes (administrative divisions) in Carreño, a municipality within the province and autonomous community of Asturias, in northern Spain.

The postal code is 33438.

Villages and hamlets
 La Cespedera
 El Fondo
 Mazaneda
 El Monte
 Naves
 La Rebollada
 San Pablo
 Villar

References 

Parishes in Carreño